National Highway 150 (NH 150) is a National Highway in India. This is highway runs from Gulbarga to Devasuguru in the Indian state of Karnataka.

Route 
Sholapur, Akkalkote, Dhudhani, Afzalpur, Chowdapur, Kalburgi(Gulbarga), Shahabad(Bhankur), Wadi, Yadgir, Krishna.

See also 
 List of National Highways in India (by Highway Number)
 List of National Highways in India
 National Highways Development Project

References

External links 
 NH 150 on OpenStreetMap

National highways in India
National Highways in Karnataka
National Highways in Maharashtra